The 1981 U.S. Women's Open was the 36th U.S. Women's Open, held July 23–26 at La Grange Country Club in LaGrange, Illinois, a suburb west of Chicago.

Three strokes back after 54 holes, Pat Bradley shot a final round 66 (−6) to win her only U.S. Women's Open, one stroke ahead of runner-up  It was the second of Bradley's six major titles.

Kathy Whitworth had her best chance to win the U.S. Women's Open, the only major championship to elude her. She co-led after 18 and 36 holes, and led by a stroke over Bonnie Lauer after the third round. Both faded on Sunday as Whitworth carded a 74 (+2) to finish five strokes back in solo third. With that, she became the first to exceed one million dollars in career earnings on the LPGA Tour.

The course hosted the championship seven years earlier in 1974.

Past champions in the field

Made the cut

Source:

Missed the cut

Source:

Final leaderboard
Sunday, July 26, 1981

Source:

References

External links
Golf Observer final leaderboard
U.S. Women's Open Golf Championship
La Grange Country Club

U.S. Women's Open
Golf in Illinois
Sports competitions in Illinois
La Grange, Illinois
U.S. Women's Open
U.S. Women's Open
U.S. Women's Open
U.S. Women's Open
Women's sports in Illinois